Les Misérables is a 1935 American drama film starring Fredric March and Charles Laughton based upon the 1862 Victor Hugo novel of the same name. The movie was adapted by W. P. Lipscomb and directed by Richard Boleslawski. This was the last film for Twentieth Century Pictures before it merged with Fox Film Corporation to form 20th Century Fox. The plot of the film basically follows Hugo's novel Les Misérables, but there are many differences.

The film was nominated for the Oscar for Best Picture, the Academy Award for Best Assistant Director, the Academy Award for Best Cinematography, and the Academy Award for Best Film Editing. The National Board of Review named the film the sixth best of 1935.

Plot summary

Cast

 Fredric March as Jean Valjean/Champmathieu
 Charles Laughton as Inspector Émile Javert
 Cedric Hardwicke as Bishop Myriel
 Rochelle Hudson as Cosette
 Marilyn Knowlden as Young Cosette
 Florence Eldridge as Fantine
 John Beal as Marius
 Frances Drake as Éponine
 Ferdinand Gottschalk and Jane Kerr as the Thénardiers
 Vernon Downing as Brissac
 Leonid Kinskey as Genflou 
 Ian Maclaren as Head Gardener
 John Carradine as Enjolras
 Heinie Conklin as Drunk at Inn (uncredited) 
 Harry Cording as Beam Warder (uncredited)
 Olaf Hytten as Pierre (uncredited)

Differences from the novel
This adaptation made quite a lot of changes, many of which can also be found in later adaptations:
 Valjean's trial, life as a convict and release are presented chronologically, whereas in the novel his previous life is presented in flashback. In addition, the novel begins by introducing the bishop, while in the film he does not appear until Valjean arrives at his door.
 The film begins with Valjean being sentenced in 1800 for ten years, rather than in 1796 for five years.
 While the word "galleys" was still used until the late 19th century to designate the French Bagnios, the actual penalty of sending someone to the galleys was abolished in mid-18th century. The galleys portrayed in this film are a huge anachronism.
 In the film, Javert is shown being assigned to the galleys, and seeing Valjean's display of strength at the beginning. In the novel he is not introduced until after Valjean has become mayor.
 Javert's first name is given as Émile, while in the novel it is never given.
 In the film, Valjean's prison number is 2906, while in the novel it is 24601.
 In the novel, Javert is described as a tall man, with a small head, sunken eyes, large sideburns and long hair hanging over his eyes, which differs greatly from Charles Laughton's appearance, and his version of Javert in the film wears different clothes than in the novel.
 Valjean is released after the 10-year sentence, despite mention of an escape attempt. In the novel he spends 19 years in prison, having been given extra time for trying to escape. He still receives a yellow passport, branding him a violent man for his attempts, however.
 In the film, there is no mention of Fantine selling her hair and teeth, or becoming a prostitute, to afford her payments to the Thénardiers. When she confronts Valjean, she does appear to be dressed like a prostitute, but neither Valjean nor Javert make any reference to her clothing.
 In the film, Valjean brings Cosette to Fantine before Fantine dies, while in the novel Cosette does not meet her mother again and is not informed of her mother's identity or fate until Valjean is on his own deathbed, at the end of the novel.
 The Thénardiers' inn is called "The Sergeant at Waterloo" in the novel, but is called "The Brave Sergeant" in the film.
 In the novel, Valjean pays Thénardier 1,500 francs to settle Fantine's debts and takes Cosette, the Thénardiers appear in Paris several years later. No discussion regarding Valjean's intentions takes place in the film; after speaking with Cosette alone, Valjean is seen riding away with her and the Thénardiers are not seen again.
 In the novel, only three prisoners (Brevet, Chenildieu, and Cochepaille) identify Champmathieu as being Valjean, in court. The film adds a fourth convict, Genflou, to the witnesses.
 In the film Valjean and Cosette go to the convent with a letter of introduction from M. Madeleine, whereas in the novel they came upon the convent purely coincidentally while fleeing from Javert.
 We see Valjean rescue a man whose cart had fallen on him, which arouses Javert's suspicion, but the film does not mention that this man (Fauchelevent) and the gardener at the convent are the same person.
 Marius meets Valjean and Cosette while they ride into the park where he is giving a speech, while in the novel he is simply walking in the Luxembourg Garden when he sees them.
 Éponine's role is changed from the novel. In the film, she is the secretary of the revolutionary society Marius belongs to. In the novel, she is the Thénardiers' daughter, and is not connected to the revolutionary society. The film makes no mention of her being the Thénardiers' daughter.
 Gavroche is cut entirely.
 In the novel, Enjolras is the leader of the revolutionaries and Marius is not even a very faithful follower (him being a Bonapartist with different ideas than his friends). In the film, Marius is the leader. In addition, the students' goal is not a democracy but to better the conditions in the French galleys. Marius says himself: "We are not revolutionaries."
 In the film, Éponine delivers the message from Marius to Cosette, which Valjean intercepts, causing Valjean to come to the barricade to rescue Marius. In the novel, Gavroche delivers it.
 In the film, Javert pursues Valjean and Marius into the sewers, which he does not in the novel, although he does meet Valjean when he exits the sewers, having pursued Thénardier there.
 Valjean brings Marius to Valjean's house and Cosette, while in the novel Valjean brings Marius to the house of Marius' grandfather M. Gillenormand, who does not appear in the film. Also, while Valjean thinks Javert is waiting for him and he is going away, he gives Marius and Cosette instructions, including to love each other always and leaving the candlesticks to Cosette, which in the novel appear in his deathbed scene.
 In the film, Valjean hides the fact that he expects Javert to arrest him by reiterating to Cosette and Marius his plan to move to England.
 The film ends with Javert's suicide, while at the end of the novel Valjean dies of grief after having been separated from Cosette, because Marius severed all ties with him after learning of Valjean's convict past, but both arrive to see him before he dies.

See also
 Adaptations of Les Misérables

References

External links
 
 
 
 
 
 Review by film historian Tim Brayton

Films based on Les Misérables
1935 films
1930s historical drama films
American historical drama films
Films scored by Alfred Newman
Films directed by Ryszard Bolesławski
American black-and-white films
United Artists films
Films produced by Darryl F. Zanuck
Twentieth Century Pictures films
1935 drama films
1930s English-language films
1930s American films